Kwadrofonik is a Polish band. The unusual combination of percussionists and pianists is the only such quartet in Poland and one of a few in the world.

Founded in 2005, they perform compositions from the twentieth and twenty-first centuries. Their music is inspired by composers like Bartok, George Crumb and Luciano Berio.
Through improvisation and musical dialogues they make maximum use of the possibilities offered by two pianos and percussion. The instruments exchange functions almost
imperceptibly – the pianos become percussion instruments, while percussion instruments become the melodic ones.
For the arrangement of folk songs performed at the ninth Folk Music Festival Nowa Tradycja (New Tradition) in 2006, the musicians were awarded the Grand Prix, an Award from the President of Warsaw and also one from the public – "Burza Braw" (Burst of Applause).

Discography

References

Polish folk groups